Dasht-e Kavir ( in classical Persian, from khwar (low), and dasht (plain, flatland)), also known as Kavir-e Namak and the Great Salt Desert, is a large desert lying in the middle of the Iranian Plateau. The area of this desert stretches from the Alborz mountain range in the north-west to the Dasht-e Lut in the south-east. It is partitioned among the Iranian provinces of Khorasan, Semnan, Tehran, Isfahan and Yazd.

Features
In the western part of the desert lies the Daryahcheh-e Namak ("salt lake"), . It contains some large salt plates in a mosaic-like shape. It is part of a  protected ecological zone, the Kavir National Park. One of the most desolate parts of Dasht-e Kavir is the Rig-e Jenn (‘Dune of the Jinn’).

Climate and structure

Dasht-e Kavir's has an arid climate with little precipitation. However, there is usually some rainfall in winter, as well as the mountains that surround it, provide plenty of runoff—enough to create vast seasonal lakes, marshlands and playas. The weather can get quite cold during the nighttime in winter, routinely dropping to below  in some areas. Rain usually falls in winter. 

Usually more elevated areas in Dasht e Kavir have a cold desert climate (BWk) while less elevated areas have a hot desert climate (BWh).

The desert soil is covered with sand and pebbles; there are marshes, seasonal lakes and seasonal river beds. The high temperatures and low humidity cause extreme vaporization, which leaves the marshes and mud grounds with large crusts of salt. Heavy storms frequently occur and they can cause sand hills reaching up to 40 m in height. Some parts of Dasht-e Kavir have a more steppe-like appearance.

Post-Glacial lake system
Almost 3,000 years ago, at the start of the post-glacial era, the Kavir was a series of vast lakes: the Asian monsoon reached deep into central Iran, bringing heavy summer rain that formed numerous lakes in the closed basins of the central Iranian Plateau that today comprises the Kavir and other deserts in the area. There are inscriptions at teppeh Sialk noting that a local queen had traveled to visit the ruler of a town (identified as Tell-i Bakun, southeast of Yazd) by "sailing the sea". Copious shorelines at various elevations still extant in the Kavir are telltale signs of the post-glacial, monsoonal lakes in central Iran, where desert now dominates.

Wildlife

Vegetation in the Dasht-e Kavir is adapted to the hot and arid climate as well as to the saline soil in which it is rooted. Common plant species like shrubs and grasses can only be found in some valleys and on mountain tops. The most widespread plant is mugwort.

The Persian ground jay is a bird species living in some parts of the desert plateaus, along with Hairy bustards, larks and sandgrouse.

Persian gazelles live in parts of steppe and desert areas of the central plateau. Wild sheep (Ovis orientalis), camels, goats (Capra aegagrus) and Persian leopards are common in mountainous areas. Night life brings on wild cats, wolves, foxes, and other carnivores. In some parts of the desert, the Persian onager (gur in Persian) and sometimes even the Asiatic cheetah can be seen. Lizards and snakes live in different places in the central plateau.

Cultivation
The extreme heat and many storms in Dasht-e Kavir cause extensive erosion, which makes it almost impossible to cultivate the lands. The desert is almost uninhabited and knows little exploitation. Camel and sheep breeding and agriculture are the sources of living to the few people living on its soil. Human settlement is restricted to some oases, where wind-blocking housing constructions are raised to deal with the harsh weather conditions. For irrigation, Iranians developed a sophisticated system of water-wells known as qanats. These are still in use, and modern globally used water-revenue systems are based on their techniques.

See also
  ('Desert of Emptiness')

References

Deserts of Iran
Geography of Isfahan Province
Geography of Tehran Province
Geography of Yazd Province
Iranian Plateau
Physiographic sections
Geography of Semnan Province
Salt flats